Jiří Lanský (17 September 1933 – 14 February 2017) was a Czech high jumper who won silver medals at the 1954 and 1958 European Championships. He finished seventh at the 1960 Summer Olympics.

References

1933 births
2017 deaths
Czech male high jumpers
Olympic athletes of Czechoslovakia
Athletes (track and field) at the 1960 Summer Olympics
European Athletics Championships medalists
Athletes from Prague